Karen I. Aardal (born 1961) is a Norwegian and Dutch applied mathematician, theoretical computer scientist, and operations researcher. Her research involves combinatorial optimization, integer programming, approximation algorithms, and facility location, with applications such as positioning emergency vehicles to optimize their response time. She is a professor in the Delft Institute of Applied Mathematics at the Delft University of Technology, and the chair of the Mathematical Optimization Society for the 2016–2019 term.

Education and career
Aardal is originally from Norway. She earned her Ph.D. in 1992 at the Université catholique de Louvain in Belgium. Her dissertation, On the Solution of One and Two-Level Capacitated Facility Location Problems by the Cutting Plane Approach, was supervised by Laurence Wolsey. Her dissertation won the second-place SOLA Dissertation Award of the Institute for Operations Research and the Management Sciences Section on Location Analysis.

Aardal was formerly a researcher at the Dutch Centrum Wiskunde & Informatica, and additionally affiliated with Eindhoven University of Technology since 2005. She moved to Delft in 2008.

She was elected to the 2019 class of Fellows of the Institute for Operations Research and the Management Sciences.

References

External links
 
 

1961 births
Living people
Norwegian mathematicians
Norwegian women computer scientists
Dutch mathematicians
Dutch computer scientists
Norwegian women mathematicians
Dutch women mathematicians
Dutch women computer scientists
Operations researchers
Université catholique de Louvain alumni
Academic staff of the Eindhoven University of Technology
Academic staff of the Delft University of Technology
Norwegian expatriates in Belgium
Norwegian emigrants to the Netherlands
Fellows of the Institute for Operations Research and the Management Sciences
21st-century Norwegian women